Uwins Island is located off the Kimberley coast of Western Australia. 

Small area of mangroves, Avicennia marina and Ceriops tagal, are found on the island.

Threatened and priority fauna found on the island include the northern quoll, golden bandicoot, and golden-backed tree-rat.

The little rock-wallaby and the warabi both of which are little known on the mainland are also both found on the island.

References 

Islands of the Kimberley (Western Australia)
Bonaparte Archipelago